Princess Sophia Wilhelmina of Saxe-Coburg-Saalfeld (9 August 1693, in Saalfeld – 4 December 1727, in Rudolstadt) was a Princess of Saxe-Coburg-Saalfeld by birth, and Princess of Schwarzburg-Rudolstadt by marriage.

Life 
Sophia Wilhelmina was the eldest daughter of John Ernest IV, Duke of Saxe-Coburg-Saalfeld (1658–1729), from his second marriage to Charlotte Johanna of Waldeck-Wildungen (1644–1699), daughter of Josias II, Count of Waldeck-Wildungen. The bond between the two families was further strengthened three years later, when her brother, Francis Josias, married her husband's sister, Anna Sophia.  The close bond with the very pious court at Rudolstadt also meant that pietism gained a foothold in Saxe-Coburg-Saalfeld.  Sophia Wilhelmina's half-brother, Christian Ernest II, supported this development.

Marriage and issue 
On 8 February 1720 in Saalfeld, Sophie Wilhelmine married Frederick Anton, Prince of Schwarzburg-Rudolstadt. The couple had the following children:
 John Frederick, Prince of Schwarzburg-Rudolstadt (1721–1767); married in 1744 Princess Bernardina Christina Sophia of Saxe-Weimar-Eisenach (1724–1757)
 Princess Sophia Wilhelmina of Schwarzburg-Rudolstadt (1723)
 Princess Sophia Albertina of Schwarzburg-Rudolstadt (1724–1799)

References 

 Ermentrude von Ranke: Das Fürstentum Schwarzburg-Rudolstadt zu Beginn des 18. Jahrhunderts, 1915, p. 16

External links 

House of Wettin
House of Schwarzburg
1693 births
1727 deaths
18th-century German people
Sophia Wilhelmina
Princesses of Schwarzburg
Daughters of monarchs